Fly Pan Am is the eponymous debut album of Fly Pan Am. It was released in October 1999 by Constellation Records.

The album contains a re-recording of the song, "L'espace au sol est redessiné par d'immenses panneaux bleus", which was featured on a split single in 1998 with Godspeed You! Black Emperor.

The record also features strange use of instruments and cadence, as well as electronic noises, provided by guest musician Alexandre St-Onge, that abruptly intersect the music. Their second album, titled Ceux qui inventent n'ont jamais vécu (?), employs the same electronic dissonance, but to a higher degree.

Track listing
 "L'espace au sol est redessiné par d'immenses panneaux bleus..." ("The Floorspace Is Redesigned by Huge Blue Signs...") – 13:30
 "...Et aussi l'éclairage de plastique au centre de tout ces compartiments latéraux" ("...And Also the Lighting of Plastic in the Center of All These Lateral Compartments") – 9:29
 "Dans ses cheveux soixante circuits" ("In Her Hair Are Sixty Circuits") – 17:45
 "Bibi à Nice, 1921" ("Bibi in Nice, 1921") – 9:58
 "Nice est en feu!" ("Nice Is on Fire!") – 9:36

Personnel

Fly Pan Am
 Jonathan Parant – guitar, tapes
 Felix Morel – drums, tapes
 Roger Tellier-Craig – guitar, tapes
 J.S. Truchy – bass guitar, tapes

Other musicians
 Alexandre St-Onge – electronics (on "Dans ses cheveux soixante circuits")
 Kara Lacy – vocals (on "Bibi à Nice, 1921" and "Nice est en feu!")
 Norsola Johnson – vocals (on "Bibi à Nice, 1921" and "Nice est en feu!")

Production
 Ian Ilavsky – record producer
 Andrew Frank – audio mastering
 Larry Cassini – audio mastering
 Harris Newman – audio mastering

See also
 Avant-garde
 Music of Quebec

Notes

External links
 Cstrecords.com, the official homepage of Constellation Records.

1999 debut albums
Constellation Records (Canada) albums
Fly Pan Am albums